Sayyid Jamaluddin Mousavi is a BBC Persian TV presenter.  He  started working for the BBC in 2001 as a journalist when he joined the BBC's Central Asia magazine in Iran and Afghanistan. Before joining the BBC, Jamal was the editor of a weekly publication for Afghan refugees living in Mashhad, the province capital of Iran's Khorasan province where he also managed a UNHCR project to train young Afghan journalists. Jamal comes from Afghanistan although he grew up and studied in Iran.

References

1976 births
Living people
British male journalists
British radio personalities
Al-Moussawi family